Incheon Bus Terminal, not far from Incheon City Hall, is the busiest bus station in Incheon, South Korea and the main gateway for intranational buses connecting Incheon city. It is operated by Incheon Transit Corporation which was founded by the city government.

The eponymous subway station of Incheon Subway line 1 (Incheon Bus Terminal Station) and a Lotte department store are located by the terminal. The area in front of the terminal is one of the most congested in Incheon.

Bus stations in South Korea
Buildings and structures in Incheon